Coleophora dentiferella is a moth of the family Coleophoridae. It is found in Italy, France, Austria, the Czech Republic, Slovakia, Hungary, North Macedonia and Greece.

The larvae feed on the leaves of Minuartia mutabilis.

References

dentiferella
Moths described in 1952
Moths of Europe